"Electric" is an English language single by Swedish pop/synth rock band Melody Club, taken from their 2002 debut album Music Machine. "Electric" was a follow-up single to their debut single "Palace Station" from the same album.

"Electric" was released in 2002 on Virgin Records and is produced by Dan Sundquist.

Track list
"Electric" (Producer: Dan Sundquist) (4:00)
"In Motion" (2:39)

Charts performance
It reached #18 on its first week of release, its highest position, staying for 20 weeks in the Swedish Singles Chart from 21 November 2002 until 3 April 2003.

Remixes
In 2003, following the success of the song, Håkan Lidbo released a remix of the song again on Virgin Records Sweden

Track list
Electric (Radiowave Remix) (5:25)
Electric (Electrowave Remix) (4:46)

Slava version

Slava (in ), a Russian dance act, made a cover of the song in 2010. Released in Russia, it was also made available in Sweden as it is a cover of a popular Swedish band, and it features in the Slava version a Swedish singer Velvet. The Swedish release was on Warner Sweden and Extensive Music Sweden.

Track list:
"Electric" (Original Radio Version) (3:06)  
"Electric" (Extended Version) (4:44)

Cameron Cartio version

In 2011, Cameron Cartio, a Swedish pop star of Iranian origin made a cover of the song in Persian language from his upcoming second album. It is released on  Universal Music Group, Sherfa Music Taraneh Records. Cartio also released a music video of the song directed by his brother Alec Cartio.

References

External links

2002 songs
Melody Club songs
Cameron Cartio songs
2002 singles
2011 singles